Clayton Park may refer to:

 Clayton Park, Nova Scotia, a suburb of Halifax, Nova Scotia
 Clayton Park (album), a 1999 album by Canadian rock band Thrush Hermit